Solanum is a large and diverse genus of flowering plants, which include three food crops of high economic importance: the potato, the tomato and the eggplant (aubergine, brinjal). It is the largest genus in the nightshade family Solanaceae, comprising around 1,500 species. It also contains the so-called horse nettles (unrelated to the genus of true nettles, Urtica), as well as numerous plants cultivated for their ornamental flowers and fruit.

Solanum species show a wide range of growth habits, such as annuals and perennials, vines, subshrubs, shrubs, and small trees. Many formerly independent genera like Lycopersicon (the tomatoes) and Cyphomandra are now included in Solanum as subgenera or sections. Thus, the genus today contains roughly 1,500–2,000 species.

Name
Its derivation is uncertain, possibly stemming from the Latin word , meaning "sun", referring to its status as a plant of the sun.

Species having the common name "nightshade"
The species most commonly called nightshade in North America and Britain is Solanum dulcamara, also called bittersweet or woody nightshade (so-called because it is a (scandent) shrub). Its foliage and egg-shaped red berries are poisonous, the active principle being solanine, which can cause convulsions and death if taken in large doses. Black nightshade (Solanum nigrum) is also generally considered poisonous, but its fully-ripened fruit and its foliage are both cooked and eaten in some areas. Deadly nightshade (Atropa belladonna) belongs, like Solanum, to subfamily Solanoideae of the nightshade family, but, unlike that genus, is a member of tribe Hyoscyameae (Solanum belongs to tribe Solaneae). The chemistry of Atropa species is very different from that of Solanum species and features the very toxic tropane alkaloids, the best-known of which is atropine.

Food crops
Most parts of the plants, especially the green parts and unripe fruit, are poisonous to humans (although not necessarily to other animals), but many species in the genus bear some edible parts, such as fruits, leaves, or tubers. Three crops in particular have been bred and harvested for consumption by humans for centuries, and are now cultivated on a global scale:
 Tomato, S. lycopersicum
 Tomato varieties are sometimes bred from both S. lycopersicum and wild tomato species such as S. pimpinellifolium, S. peruvianum, S. cheesmanii, S. galapagense, S. chilense, etc. (such varieties include—among others—Bicentennial, Dwarf Italian, Epoch, Golden Sphere, Hawaii, Ida Red, Indigo Rose, Kauai, Lanai, Marion, Maui, Molokai, Niihau, Oahu, Owyhee, Parma, Payette, Red Lode, Super Star, Surecrop, Tuckers Forcing, V 121, Vantage, Vetomold, and Waltham.)
 Potato, S. tuberosum, fourth largest food crop.
 Less important but cultured relatives used in small amounts include S. stenotomum, S. phureja, S. goniocalyx, S. ajanhuiri, S. chaucha, S. juzepczukii, S. curtilobum.
 Eggplant (also known as brinjal or aubergine), S. melongena

Other species are significant food crops regionally, such as Ethiopian eggplant or gilo (S. aethiopicum), naranjilla or lulo (S. quitoense), Turkey berry (S. torvum), pepino or pepino melon (S. muricatum), Tamarillo (S. betaceum), wolf apple (S. lycocarpum), garden huckleberry (S. scabrum) and "bush tomatoes" (several Australian species).

Ornamentals
The species most widely seen in cultivation as ornamental plants are:
S. aviculare (kangaroo apple)
S. capsicastrum (false Jerusalem cherry, winter cherry)
S. crispum (Chilean potato tree)
S. laciniatum (kangaroo apple)
S. laxum (potato vine)
S. pseudocapsicum (Christmas cherry, winter cherry)
S. rantonnetii (blue potato bush)
S. seaforthianum (Italian jasmine, St. Vincent lilac)
S. mauritianum (woolly nightshade, earleaf nightshade)
S. wendlandii (paradise flower, potato vine)

Medicine
Poisonings associated with certain species of Solanum are not uncommon and may be fatal. However, several species are locally used in folk medicine, particularly by native people who have long employed them.

Ecology
Solanum species are used as food plants by the larvae of some Lepidoptera species (butterflies and moths) – see list of Lepidoptera that feed on Solanum.

Systematics

The genus was established by Carl Linnaeus in 1753. Its subdivision has always been problematic, but slowly some sort of consensus is being achieved.

The following list is a provisional lineup of the genus' traditional subdivisions, together with some notable species. Many of the subgenera and sections might not be valid; they are used here provisionally as the phylogeny of this genus is not fully resolved yet and many species have not been reevaluated.

Cladistic analyses of DNA sequence data suggest that the present subdivisions and rankings are largely invalid. Far more subgenera would seem to warrant recognition, with Leptostemonum being the only one that can at present be clearly subdivided into sections. Notably, it includes as a major lineage several members of the traditional sections Cyphomandropsis and the old genus Cyphomandra. 

A recent study built a densely sampled species-level phylogeny for Solanum comprising 60% of all accepted species based on full plastome dataset and nuclear target-capture data. While the taxonomic framework of Solanum remained stable, researchers observed gene tree conflicts and discordance between phylogenetic trees generated from the target-capture and plastome datasets. The latter corresponded to regions with short internodal branches, and network analysis and polytomy tests suggested the backbone is composed of three polytomies found at different evolutionary depths. The strongest area of discordance, near the crown node of Solanum, was found to be a hard polytomy. Currently, the most likely explanation for the discordance along the backbone of Solanum is due to incomplete lineage sorting (ILS) caused by rapid speciation. Presence of short internal branches is typical of ILS in lineages with large population sizes and high mutation rates. This fits with the biology of Solanum in general, which is typically known to contain “weedy”, disturbance-loving pioneer species resilient to change. Many species are known to have large geographical ranges and ecological amplitude. Some of the weedy characteristics found in these species include the ability to improve fitness and defense traits in response to disturbance, as well as having allelopathic properties which allow them to establish themselves to the detriment of native vegetation. If such characteristics were present in ancestral Solanum, they could have promoted rapid speciation across the globe, followed by rapid morphological evolution and speciation within areas. The patterns observed here could possibly be the result of three major rapid speciation “pulses” across the evolutionary history of Solanum. The idea of an ecologically opportunistic ancestor is supported by the tendency of many of the major clades to occupy periodically highly stressed and disturbed habitats, including flooded varzea forests, hyper-arid deserts, and highly disturbed and dynamic open mid-elevation Andean montane habitats, where landslides are among the most common areas where many of the species are found. The idea that well-supported and fully bifurcating phylogenies are a requisite for evolutionary studies is built on the premise that such trees are the accurate way of representing evolution. The shift in systematics from “tree”- to “bush”-like thinking, where polytomies and reticulate patterns of evolution are considered as acceptable or real, comes from the accumulation of studies finding similar unresolvable phylogenetic nodes, despite using different large-scale genomic sampling strategies and various analytical methods. We argue that acknowledging and embracing polytomies and reticulation is crucial if we are to design research programs aimed at understanding the biology of large and rapidly radiating lineages, such as the large and economically important Solanum.

Subgenus Bassovia
Section Allophylla
 Solanum granuloso-leprosum
Section Cyphomandropsis
 Solanum glaucophyllum Desf. – Waxy-leaved nightshade
Section Pachyphylla
 Solanum betaceum Cav. – Tamarillo
 Solanum exiguum
 Solanum roseum

Subgenus Leptostemonum

Section Acanthophora
 Solanum aculeatissimum Jacq. – Indian nightshade
 Solanum atropurpureum Schrank – Five-minute plant
 Solanum capsicoides – Cockroach berry, polohauaiʻi (Polynesian)
 Solanum mammosum – Nipplefruit, titty fruit, cow's udder, "apple of Sodom"
 Solanum palinacanthum Dunal
 Solanum viarum Dunal – Tropical soda apple
Section Androceras: 12 spp.
 Series Androceras
 Series Violaceiflorum
 Series Pacificum
Section Anisantherum
Section Campanulata
Section Crinitum
Section Croatianum
Section Erythrotrichum
 Solanum robustum H.L.Wendl. – Shrubby nightshade
Section Graciliflorum
Section Herposolanum
 Solanum wendlandii Hook.f. – Giant potatocreeper
Section Irenosolanum
 Solanum incompletum Dunal – Pōpolo kū mai (Hawaii)
 Solanum nelsonii Dunal – Nelson's horsenettle, Ākia (Hawaii)
 Solanum sandwicense Hook. & Arn. – Hawaiian horsenettle, Pōpoloaiakeakua (Oahu, Kauai)
Section Ischyracanthum
Section Lasiocarpa
 Solanum lasiocarpum Dunal
 Solanum pseudolulo – lulo de perro (Colombia)
 Solanum quitoense – lulo (Colombia), naranjilla (Ecuador)
 Solanum sessiliflorum – Cocona
Section Melongena
 Solanum aculeastrum – Soda apple, sodaapple nightshade, goat apple, poison apple, "bitter-apple"
 Solanum campechiense – Redberry nightshade
 Solanum carolinense  – Carolina horsenettle, radical weed, sand brier, devil's tomato, "bull nettle", "tread-softly", "apple of Sodom", "wild tomato" (southeastern United States)
 Solanum cataphractum (northern Western Australia, including Coronation Island)
 Solanum citrullifolium A.Braun – Watermelon nightshade (southern United States)
 Solanum dimidiatum Raf. – Torrey's nightshade
 Solanum elaeagnifolium – Silver-leaved nightshade, prairie berry, silverleaf nettle, white horsenettle, silver nightshade, "bull-nettle", "trompillo" (Spanish); Silver-leaf bitter-apple, satansbos (South Africa)
 Solanum heterodoxum Dunal – Melon-leaved nightshade
 Solanum incanum L.
 Solanum linnaeanum – Devil's apple, "apple of Sodom"
 Solanum macrocarpon L.
 Solanum marginatum L.f. – White-margined nightshade
 Solanum melongena – Eggplant, aubergine (including S. ovigerum)
 Solanum rostratum Dunal – Buffalo bur, Texas thistle
 Solanum sisymbriifolium Lam. – Sticky nightshade, fire-and-ice
 Solanum virginianum L.
Section Micracantha
 Solanum jamaicense Mill. – Jamaican nightshade
 Solanum lanceifolium Jacq. – Lance-leaved nightshade
 Solanum tampicense Dunal – Wetland nightshade
Section Monodolichopus
Section Nycterium
Section Oliganthes
 Solanum aethiopicum – Ethiopian eggplant, nakati, mock tomato, Ethiopian nightshade; including S. gilo (scarlet eggplant, Gilo or jiló)
 Solanum centrale – Australian desert raisin, bush raisin, bush sultana, "bush tomato", akatjurra (Alyawarre),  kampurarpa (Pitjantjatjara), merne akatyerre (Arrernte), kutjera
 Solanum cleistogamum – "bush tomato", merne mwanyerne (Arrernte)
 Solanum ellipticum – Potato bush, "bush tomato"
 Solanum pyracanthos Lam. – Porcupine tomato, Devil's Thorn
 Solanum quadriloculatum F.Muell. – "bush tomato", "wild tomato" (Australia)
Section Persicariae
 Solanum bahamense L. – Bahama nightshade, canker berry, berengena de playa
 Solanum ensifolium Dunal – Erubia
Section Polytrichum
Section Pugiunculifera
Section Somalanum
Section Torva
 Solanum asteropilodes
 Solanum chrysotrichum Schltdl. – Giant devil's-fig
 Solanum lanceolatum – Orangeberry nightshade
 Solanum paniculatum – Jurubeba
 Solanum torvum – Turkey berry, devil's fig, prickly nightshade, shoo-shoo bush, wild eggplant, pea eggplant

Subgenus Lyciosolanum
 Solanum guineense L.

Subgenus Solanum sensu stricto

Section Afrosolanum
Section Anarrhichomenum
 Solanum baretiae
Section Archaesolanum
 Solanum aviculare – Poroporo (New Zealand), kangaroo apple (Australia)
Section Basarthrum
 Solanum catilliflorum
 Solanum muricatum – Pepino dulce, pepino melon, melon pear, "pepino", "tree melon"
 Solanum perlongistylum
 Solanum tergosericeum
Section Benderianum
Section Brevantherum
 Solanum bullatum
 Solanum erianthum D.Don – Potato tree, "mullein nightshade"
 Solanum mauritianum – Woolly nightshade, ear-leaved nightshade, flannel weed, bugweed, tobacco weed, kerosene plant, "wild tobacco" (Australia)
 Solanum evolvuloides
Section Dulcamara
 Solanum crispum – Chilean potato vine, Chilean nightshade, Chilean potato tree
 Solanum dulcamara – Bittersweet
 Solanum imbaburense
 Solanum laxum Spreng. – Jasmine nightshade
 Solanum leiophyllum
 Solanum seaforthianum Andrews – Brazilian nightshade
 Solanum triquetrum Cav. – Texas nightshade
 Solanum wallacei – Wallace's nightshade, Catalina nightshade, Clokey's nightshade, "wild tomato" (including S. clokeyi)
 Solanum xanti – Purple nightshade, San Diego nightshade
Section Herpystichum
Section Holophylla
 Solanum diphyllum L. – Twin-leaved nightshade
 Solanum pseudocapsicum – Jerusalem cherry, Madeira winter cherry, "winter cherry" (including S. capsicastrum)
 Solanum pseudoquina (including S. inaequale Vell.)
Section Juglandifolia
 Solanum juglandifolium
 Solanum ochranthum
Section Lemurisolanum
Section Lycopersicoides
 Solanum lycopersicoides Dunal – Peruvian wolfpeach
 Solanum sitiens
Section Lycopersicon

 Solanum arcanum Peralta – "wild tomato"
 Solanum chilense
 Solanum corneliomulleri
 Solanum huaylasense Peralta
 Solanum peruvianum L. – Peruvian nightshade, "wild tomato"
 Solanum cheesmaniae (L.Riley) Fosberg
 Solanum chmielewskii
 Solanum galapagense S.C.Darwin & Peralta
 Solanum habrochaites
 Solanum lycopersicum – Tomato
 Solanum neorickii
 Solanum pennellii
 Solanum pimpinellifolium – Currant tomato

Section Macronesiotes
Section Normania
 †Solanum nava (?)
Section Petota
 Solanum albornozii
 Solanum bulbocastanum – Ornamental nightshade
 Solanum bukasovii Juz. ex Rybin
 Solanum burtonii
 Solanum cardiophyllum – Heart-leaved nightshade
 Solanum chilliasense
 Solanum commersonii Dunal – Commerson's nightshade
 Solanum demissum Lindl. – Dwarf wild potato
 Solanum jamesii – Wild potato
 Solanum minutifoliolum
 Solanum paucijugum
 Solanum phureja Juz. & Bukasov
 Solanum pinnatisectum Dunal – Tansy-leaved nightshade
 Solanum regularifolium
 Solanum stoloniferum Schltdl. – Tigna potato, Fendler's horsenettle
 Solanum stenotomum (including S. goniocalyx)
 Solanum ternatum (including S. ternifolium)
 Solanum tuberosum – Potato
Section Pteroidea
Section Quadrangulare
Section Regmandra
Section Solanum
 Solanum adscendens Sendtner – Sonoita nightshade (Americas)
 Solanum americanum Mill. – American nightshade, American black nightshade, glossy nightshade (Americas, Hawaii)
 Solanum chenopodioides Lam. – Goosefoot nightshade, slender nightshade (including S. gracilius)
 Solanum douglasii Dunal – Green-spotted nightshade
 Solanum interius Rydb.
 Solanum melongena L.
 Solanum nigrescens M.Martens & Galeotti – Divine nightshade
 Solanum nigrum L. – European black nightshade, "black nightshade"
  S. nigrum guineense – "Garden Huckleberry"
 Solanum pseudogracile Heiser – Glowing nightshade
 Solanum ptychanthum – West Indian nightshade, Eastern black nightshade
 Solanum retroflexum – Wonderberry, sunberry
 Solanum sarrachoides – Hairy nightshade
 Solanum scabrum  Mill. – Garden huckleberry
 Solanum triflorum Nutt. – Cut-leaved nightshade
 Solanum villosum Mill. – Yellow nightshade

Other notable species

Solanum abutiloides – Dwarf tamarillo 
Solanum amygdalifolium Steud.
 Solanum bellum
 Solanum cajanumense
 Solanum chimborazense
 Solanum chrysasteroides
 Solanum cinnamomeum
 Solanum conocarpum Rich. ex Dunal – Marron bacoba
 Solanum cowiei Martine
 Solanum cremastanthemum
 Solanum davisense Whalen – Davis' horsenettle
 Solanum densepilosulum
 Solanum donianum Walp. – Mullein nightshade
 Solanum dolichorhachis
 Solanum fallax
 Solanum ferox L. – Hairy-fruited eggplant, Thai hairy-fruited eggplant
 Solanum fortunense
 Solanum furcatum – Forked nightshade
 Solanum glabratum Dunal
 Solanum haleakalaense H.St.John
 Solanum hindsianum Benth. – Hinds' nightshade
 Solanum hypermegethes
 Solanum hypocalycosarcum
 Solanum interandinum
 Solanum latiflorum
 Solanum leucodendron
 Solanum lumholtzianum Bartlett – Sonoran nightshade
 Solanum luteoalbum (including S. semicoalitum)
 Solanum lycocarpum – Wolf apple, fruta-de-lobo, lobeira (Brazil)
 Solanum melissarum Bohs
 Solanum nudum Dunal – Forest nightshade
 Solanum ovum-fringillae
 Solanum paralum
 Solanum parishii A.Heller – Parish's nightshade
 Solanum physalifolium Rusby
 Solanum pinetorum
 Solanum polygamum Vahl – Cakalaka berry
 Solanum pyrifolium Lam.
 Solanum pubescens Willd.
 Solanum riedlei Dunal – Riedle's nightshade
 Solanum rudepannum Dunal
 Solanum rugosum Dunal – tabacon aspero
 Solanum sibundoyense
 Solanum sodiroi (including S. carchiense)
 Solanum sycocarpum
 Solanum tenuipes Bartlett – Fancy nightshade
 Solanum tobagense
 Solanum trilobatum L.
 Solanum umbelliferum – Bluewitch nightshade
 Solanum verrogeneum Berengena
 Solanum violaceum Ortega
 Solanum viride Spreng. – Green Nightshade
 Solanum woodburyi Howard – Woodbury's nightshade

Formerly placed here

Some plants of other genera were formerly placed in Solanum:
 Chamaesaracha coronopus (as S. coronopus)
 Lycianthes biflora (as S. multifidum Buch.-Ham. ex D.Don)
 Lycianthes denticulata (as S. gouakai var. angustifolium and var. latifolium)
 Lycianthes lycioides (as S. lycioides var. angustifolium)
 Lycianthes mociniana (as S. uniflorum Dunal in Poir. and S. uniflorum Sessé & Moc.)
 Lycianthes rantonnetii (as S. rantonnetii, S. urbanum var. ovatifolium and var. typicum)
 Undetermined species of Lycianthes have been referred to under names such as S. chrysophyllum, S. ciliatum Blume ex Miq., S. corniculatum Hiern, S. lanuginosum, S. mucronatum, S. retrofractum var. acuminatum, S. violaceum Blume, S. violifolium f. typicum, S. virgatum notst β albiflorum, S. uniflorum Lag. or S. uniflorum var. berterianum.

References

External links

Meet the TomTato: Tomatoes and potatoes grown as one – CBS News (September 26, 2013)

 
Solanaceae genera
Medicinal plants